Robert Blackwood may refer to:

Robert Blackwood (Irish MP) (1752–1785), MP for Killyleagh, son of the above
Robert Blackwood (Australian politician) (1861–1940), Australian politician, businessman and pastoralist
Sir Robert Blackwood (engineer) (1906–1982), first Chancellor of Monash University, Australia (1958–1968)
Sir Robert Blackwood, 1st Baronet (1694–1774)
Robert Blackwood of Pitreavie (1624–1720), Lord Provost of Edinburgh, 1711–1713
 Bobby Blackwood (1934–1997), Scottish footballer